Šefćet "Šeki" Bihorac (born in Sjenica, SR Serbia, Yugoslavia) is a Bosnian folk singer. He was frequently sent to Sarajevo, Bosnia during his childhood, and in Sarajevo, he began his music career.

Discography
Ne zovite doktore (1990)
Svani zoro (1993)
Majko mila (1995)
Kad me ne bude (1999)
Ti si meni bila sve (2001)
Kreni, kreni (2003)
Maloljetnja (2003)
Uživo (2006)
Mnoge žene ljubio... (2007)
Nek je sretna moja vila (2011)

External links
Official Website (in Serbian)

Living people
Year of birth missing (living people)
People from Sjenica
Bosniaks of Serbia
21st-century Bosnia and Herzegovina male singers
Bosnia and Herzegovina folk-pop singers
20th-century Bosnia and Herzegovina male singers